Daniel Congré (born 5 April 1985) is a French professional footballer who plays as a defender for Ligue 2 club Dijon. He can operate all across defence, although he is most adept at centre-back. He is noted for his pace.

Club career
Born in Toulouse, France to Martiniquais parents. Congré arrived at his hometown club Toulouse in the summer of 1996 at the age of 11, joining as a youth player. He quickly ascended through the ranks and eventually made his professional debut during the 2004–05 season in a league match against Rennes coming on as a halftime substitute. He remained on the senior squad for the rest of the season making 23 total appearances that season. The following two seasons, his play was heavily limited, mainly due to fracturing his left foot in a match against RC Lens on 20 March 2006. The injury forced him to miss not only the rest of the 2005–06 season, but also the beginning of the 2006–07 season, in which Toulouse qualified for the UEFA Champions League.

Congré endured more injuries during the 2007–08 season. A shoulder injury forced him to miss Toulouse's Champions League third round qualifying matches with Liverpool, where Toulouse were eliminated 0–5 on aggregate. He returned for Ligue 1 play, but picked up another injury forcing him to miss the rest of the season. He appeared in only 42 league matches over those three years. He returned to form for the 2008–09 season appearing in 29 league matches and scoring one goal against Le Havre contributing to Toulouse's 5th-place finish. He also scored a goal in Toulouse's 8–0 defeat of local side FCE Schirrhein in the Coupe de France. He recently signed a contract extension with the club through 2014, but on 21 June 2012 he agreed to a transfer to Montpellier HSC.

On 5 July 2021, Congré joined Ligue 2 club Dijon on a two-year deal.

International career
Congré has played on various youth football teams of France. He was a member of the France U-21 team collecting 7 caps and scoring two goals. Due to fracturing his foot, he missed the 2006 UEFA European Under-21 Football Championship. He has yet to be capped by the senior national side. Of Guadeloupean descent, he was named to the national team's preliminary squad to participate in the 2009 CONCACAF Gold Cup, but did not make the final squad. His call-up and participation would have not hindered future selections from France for Congré, as Guadeloupe (a French overseas department) is not a member of FIFA.

References

External links
 Toulouse FC Profile
 LFP Profile
 

Living people
1985 births
Footballers from Toulouse
French people of Martiniquais descent
Association football defenders
French footballers
France under-21 international footballers
Ligue 1 players
Ligue 2 players
Toulouse FC players
Montpellier HSC players
Dijon FCO players